The year 1825 in archaeology involved some significant events.

Explorations

Excavations

Publications
 Faustino Corsi's catalogue of ancient and comparative decorative stone, is published in Rome.

Finds
 Lucien Bonaparte finds the so-called Tusculum portrait of Julius Caesar at Tusculum's forum.

Awards

Miscellaneous

Births
 June 15: John Robert Mortimer, English corn-merchant and archaeologist (d. 1911)
 July 27 - Cyrus Thomas, American ethnologist and entomologist (d. 1910)

Deaths

See also
Ancient Egypt / Egyptology

References

Archaeology
Archaeology by year
Archaeology
Archaeology